Herbert De Pinna (1883–1936) was a composer and medical doctor. He was a medicine graduate from Cambridge University who trained at Middlesex Hospital. He opened a hospital in Queensland, but claimed he made more money from music.

Herbert De Pinna is best remembered for Broadway-style numbers written for successful pantomimes The Bunyip and Robinson Crusoe, which toured major Australian cities. A song from the 'Bunyip was adopted by schools and enjoyed phenomenal sales 

De Pinna won a successful Supreme Court case for defamatory remarks made to his medical clients.

During world war two,  his son Arthur was shot down and killed by Imperial Japanese Army Air Service over Kupang, Indonesia.

Works
 Seven songs for the 1914 musical Bunyip (musical)
 I Wonder
 The Parsons' Glide : two-step & one-step
 Claire : graceful dance
 Dorothy : old English dance
 Eight interesting pianoforte solos
 Devil's Picnic : for piano
 E'er Dawns Another Day
 Moonlight Surfing
 All the Girls are After Me

References

1883 births
1936 deaths
20th-century classical composers
Australian male composers
Australian composers
Composers for piano
English emigrants to Australia
Australian musical theatre composers
Composers
Australian songwriters
20th-century Australian male musicians
20th-century Australian musicians
Male jazz musicians